= Sifuna Okwethu =

Sifuna Okwethu ("We Want What's Ours")
- Directed by: Bernadette Atuahene
- Cinematography: Rodney Moyilwa & Themba Boikanyo
- Edited by: Caitlin Holtzman & Joe Nudelman
- Production companies: Documentaries to Inspire Social Change, NFP
- Release date: 2011
- Running time: under 40 minutes
- Countries: United States; South Africa
- Languages: English, Zulu

Sifuna Okwethu ("We Want What’s Ours") is a 2011 documentary film about loss, resistance, identity and the elusiveness of justice as experienced by the Ndolilas, a South African family. The family’s land was taken by the apartheid government in the 1970s without compensation, and ever since then they have been on a quest to get it back.

== Synopsis ==
The film tells the story of both sides claiming the same land as their own. The Ndolilas family’s land was taken by the apartheid government in the 1970s without compensation, and ever since then they have been on a quest to get it back. Standing in their way are working class black homeowners who purchased portions of the Ndolila's land during apartheid. For the homeowners, the land and houses they have legally purchased are a reward for their hard work and the fulfillment of their hopes and dreams for a better life in the new democracy. For the Ndolilas, the land is part of their family legacy and hence deeply intertwined with their identity. Both sides have a legitimate right to the land, and the film encourages viewers to think about whose rights should prevail.

== Production ==
Documentaries to Inspire Social Change, NFP (DISC) produced the film Sifuna Okwethu as part of the larger struggle to address severe land inequality in South Africa. Many people know that due to extensive colonial and apartheid era land theft, in 1994—when apartheid fell and Nelson Mandela came to power—87% of South Africa’s land was owned by whites although they constitute less than 10% of the population. This is an injustice by any measure. Thus, Mandela and the ANC aimed to redistribute 30% of the land in the first five years of democracy. What many people (even those who were active in the fight to eliminate apartheid) do not know is that over 15 years later less than 10% of the land has been redistributed from the hands of whites back to blacks. The filmmakers believe that this is one of the most overlooked injustices of the 21st century. To make this injustice known by more people, and dissolved by the power of media, the filmmakers decided to make the story of the Ndolilas into a documentary.

== Reception ==
According to director of the film, Bernadette Atuahene, Sifuna Okwethu charts a different path than other films on the same topic, which leads viewers towards a more complex understanding of the dynamics involved in dealing with the present-day consequences of past land theft.
